Věra Kubánková (22 July 1924 – 13 April 2016) was a Czech actress. At the 2006 Thalia Awards she was honoured in the lifetime achievement in theatre category. She worked at the Divadlo za branou during the 1960s and 1970s. Kubánková also took to the stage in the Czech cities of Jihlava and Zlín, but most of her performances came in Prague.

Selected filmography
Žena za pultem (1978, TV series)
The Night of the Emerald Moon (1985)
The Post Office Girl (1988, TV film)
Babicka (2003)
Toys in the Attic (2009)
The Snake Brothers (2015)

References

External links

1924 births
2016 deaths
Czech stage actresses
Czechoslovak stage actresses
Actors from Košice
20th-century Czech actresses
21st-century Czech actresses
Recipients of the Thalia Award